Fettuccine Alfredo or fettuccine al burro ("fettuccine with butter") is an Italian pasta dish of fresh fettuccine tossed with butter and Parmesan cheese. As the cheese melts, it emulsifies the liquids to form a smooth and rich cheese sauce coating the pasta. The dish is named after Alfredo Di Lelio, who featured the dish at his restaurant in Rome in the early to mid-20th century; the "ceremony" of preparing it tableside was an integral part of the dish.

The dish became widespread and eventually spread to the United States, where it remains popular. The recipe has changed, and its commercialized version—with heavy cream and other ingredients—is now ubiquitous. In the U.S., it is often served as a main course, sometimes garnished with chicken or other ingredients. In Italy, meanwhile, fettuccine al burro is generally considered home cooking, and "fettuccine Alfredo" is widely scoffed at by Italian writers.

History

 

Serving fettuccine with butter and cheese was first mentioned in a 15th-century recipe for maccaroni romaneschi ("Roman pasta") by Martino da Como, a northern Italian cook active in Rome; the recipe calls for cooking the pasta in broth or water and adding butter, "good cheese" (the variety is not specified) and "sweet spices".

Modern fettuccine Alfredo was invented by Alfredo Di Lelio in Rome. According to family accounts, in 1892 Alfredo Di Lelio began to work in a restaurant that was located in piazza Rosa and run by his mother Angelina. Di Lelio invented "fettuccine al triplo burro" (later named "fettuccine all'Alfredo" or "fettuccine Alfredo") in 1907 or 1908 in an effort to entice his wife, Ines, to eat after giving birth to their first child Armando. Alfredo added extra butter or "triplo burro" to the fettuccine when mixing it together for her. Piazza Rosa disappeared in 1910 following the construction of the Galleria Colonna/Sordi, and the restaurant was forced to close. Di Lelio later opened his own restaurant, Alfredo alla Scrofa, then called "Alfredo", in 1914 on the via della Scrofa in central Rome.

The fame of Alfredo's fettuccine spread, first in Rome and then to other countries. Di Lelio was made a Cavaliere dell'Ordine della Corona d'Italia.

In 1943, during the war, Di Lelio sold the restaurant to two of his waiters. In 1950, with his son Armando, Alfredo Di Lelio opened a new restaurant in piazza Augusto Imperatore, Alfredo all'Augusteo, now managed by his niece Ines Di Lelio, bringing along the famous "gold cutlery" said to have been donated in 1927 by the American actors Mary Pickford and Douglas Fairbanks in gratitude for Alfredo's hospitality. The two restaurants competed vigorously, with escalating puffery: "the king of fettuccine", "the real king of fettuccine", "the magician of fettuccine", "the emperor of fettuccine", "the real Alfredo", etc.

Preparation

The dish was so well known that Di Lelio was invited to demonstrate it both in Italy and abroad. The fame of the dish, called on Alfredo's menus maestosissime fettuccine all'Alfredo ("most majestic fettuccine, Alfredo style"), comes largely from the "spectacle reminiscent of grand opera" of its preparation at table, as described in 1967:
[The fettuccine] are seasoned with plenty of butter and fat parmesan, not aged, so that, in a ritual of extraordinary theatricality, the owner mixes the pasta and lifts it high to serve it, the white threads of cheese gilded with butter and the bright yellow of the ribbons of egg pasta offering an eyeful for the customer; at the end of the ceremony, the guest of honor is presented the golden cutlery and the serving dish, where the blond fettuccine roll around in the pale gold of the seasonings. It's worth seeing the whole ceremony. The owner, son of old Alfredo and looking exactly like him, ... bends over the great skein of fettuccine, fixes it intensely, his eyes half-closed, and dives into mixing it, waving the golden cutlery with grand gestures, like an orchestra conductor, with his sinister upwards-pointing twirled moustache dancing up and down, pinkies in the air, a rapt gaze, flailing elbows.

Recipes attributed to Di Lelio only include three ingredients: fettuccine, young Parmesan cheese and butter. Yet there are various legends about the "secret" of the original Alfredo recipe: some say oil is added to the pasta dough, others that the noodles are cooked in milk. 

Fettuccine Alfredo, minus the spectacle, has now become ubiquitous in Italian-style restaurants outside Italy, although in Italy this dish is usually called simply "fettuccine al burro".

In the United States

Alfredo's fettuccine has long been popular with Americans. By 1922, it was already being reported on by American travelers. Multiple magazine articles and guidebooks in the 1920s and 1930s extolled Alfredo's noodles. In 1927, Mary Pickford and Douglas Fairbanks supposedly dined at Alfredo's and gave him the famous gold fork and spoon. Also in 1927, the American restaurateur and writer George Rector wrote up Alfredo's fettuccine and described the ceremony of its tableside preparation, accompanied by violin music, in detail; he did not give it a specific name, nor mention golden tableware.

In the 1950s, Di Lelio promoted the dish and his restaurant by creating a photo gallery of visiting celebrities with his noodles, including Jimmy Stewart, Bob Hope, Anthony Quinn, Bing Crosby, Gary Cooper, Jack Lemmon, Ava Gardner, Tyrone Power, Sophia Loren, Cantinflas, and many others.

In 1966, the Pennsylvania Dutch Noodle Company started marketing their dried "Fettuccine Egg Noodles", which included a recipe on the package for an Alfredo sauce including cream and Swiss cheese as well as Parmesan and butter.

The American restaurant casual dining chain Olive Garden has popularized its versions of fettuccine alfredo, which may be combined with chicken, shrimp, or other foods to make main courses called "chicken alfredo", "seafood alfredo", etc. Given the strict separation of pasta and meat dishes in the usual Italian restaurant cuisine, this was never done by Di Lelio. Olive Garden's recipe also includes cream and garlic.

Alfredo sauce
Alfredo sauce is often sold as a convenience food in grocery stores in many countries. Unlike the original preparation, which is thickened only by cheese, the prepared food and fast food versions of Alfredo may be thickened with eggs or starch.

In 2020, the Alfredo alla Scrofa restaurant began offering its own bottled version of "Salsa Alfredo", promoted as using only the highest quality ingredients. It contains Parmigiano Reggiano (43%), water, butter, rice flour, and sunflower seed oil, and no cream.

See also

 List of foods named after people
 List of pasta dishes

References

Sources

External links

Cuisine of Lazio
Pasta dishes
Table-cooked dishes